Eric Wilbur Roy  (born 27 June 1948) is a New Zealand politician. He was a Member of Parliament (MP) for the National Party. He was first elected in 1993 and served, with one three-year break, until 2014.

Early years

Roy was born in Gore in 1948. Before entering politics, he was a farmer and company director. He is a Justice of the Peace.

Member of Parliament

He first entered Parliament in the 1993 election as MP for the Awarua electorate. He unsuccessfully contested the Invercargill electorate in the  but remained a list MP. Roy served as Assistant Speaker of the House from 1998 to 2002, initially under National's Doug Kidd and then under Labour's Jonathan Hunt.

Roy was not elected in the 2002 election; he was defeated by Labour's Mark Peck in Invercargill and, at 26, was not placed high enough on the National Party list to be re-elected.

In 2005, he contested the Invercargill electorate for the National Party and was re-elected to Parliament after winning the bellwether seat. He increased his majority in the 2008 election, was re-elected in 2011 election, and served as the Deputy Speaker of the House.

After parliament

Roy was appointed a Companion of the Queen's Service Order, for services as a Member of Parliament, in the 2015 New Year Honours.

On 15 June 2015, it was announced that Roy had been appointed to the board of Landcorp.

Roy was elected to the Southland Regional Council in 2016. He attempted to become chairman and deputy chairman but lost both votes 5–7.

In September 2018, Roy announced that his cattle were being tested for the cattle disease Mycoplasma bovis. In 2018, it was reported that Roy nominated Yikun Zhang, a businessman and political donor with connections to the Communist Party of China, for the New Zealand Order of Merit.

References

External links
Personal website
Page on Parliamentary website

|-

1948 births
Living people
New Zealand farmers
New Zealand National Party MPs
New Zealand list MPs
People from Gore, New Zealand
New Zealand MPs for South Island electorates
Unsuccessful candidates in the 2002 New Zealand general election
Companions of the Queen's Service Order
New Zealand justices of the peace
Members of the New Zealand House of Representatives
21st-century New Zealand politicians
Southland regional councillors